Carabus exiguus evae is a black-coloured subspecies of ground beetle in the subfamily Carabinae that is endemic to Qinghai, China.

References

exiguus evae
Beetles described in 2007
Endemic fauna of China